Scirpophaga khasis is a moth in the family Crambidae. It was described by Angoon Lewvanich in 1981. It is found in Yunnan in China and in India.

References

Moths described in 1981
Schoenobiinae
Moths of Asia